Isoplenodia arabukoensis is a moth of the family Geometridae. It is found in south-eastern Kenya, central Zimbabwe and south-western Rwanda.

References

Moths described in 2010
Scopulini
Moths of Africa